Ben Muncaster (born 14 October 2001) is a Scottish rugby union player for Edinburgh Rugby in the United Rugby Championship. Muncaster's primary position is flanker or number 8.

Rugby Union career

Professional career
Muncaster signed for Edinburgh academy in June 2020, having previously been a member of the Leicester Tigers academy. He made his Pro14 debut in Round 1 of the Pro14 Rainbow Cup against .

References

External links
Edinburgh Rugby Profile
ultimaterugby Profile

2001 births
Living people
Edinburgh Rugby players
Rugby union flankers
Rugby union number eights
Rugby union players from North Berwick
Scottish rugby union players